In  corporate finance, a tender offer is a type of public takeover bid. The tender offer is a public, open offer or invitation (usually announced in a newspaper advertisement) by a prospective acquirer to all stockholders of a publicly traded corporation (the target corporation) to tender their stock for sale at a specified price during a specified time, subject to the tendering of a minimum and maximum number of shares. In a tender offer, the bidder contacts shareholders directly; the directors of the company may or may not have endorsed the tender offer proposal.

To induce the shareholders of the target company to sell, the acquirer's offer price is usually at a premium over the current market price of the target company's shares. For example, if a target corporation's stock were trading at $10 per share, an acquirer might offer $11.50 per share to shareholders on the condition that 51% of shareholders agree. Cash or securities may be offered to the target company's shareholders, although a tender offer in which securities are offered as consideration is generally referred to as an "exchange offer".

Governing law

United States

General
In the United States of America, tender offers are regulated by the Williams Act. SEC Regulation 14E also governs tender offers. It covers such matters as:
the minimum length of time a tender offer must remain open
procedures for modifying a tender offer after it has been issued
insider trading in the context of tender offers
whether one class of shareholders can receive preferential treatment over another

Required disclosures
In the United States, under the Williams Act, codified in Section 13(d) and Section 14(d)(1) of the Securities Exchange Act of 1934, a bidder must file Schedule TO with the SEC upon commencement of the tender offer.  Among the matters required to be disclosed in schedule TO are: (i) a term sheet which summarizes the material terms of the tender offer in plain English; (ii) the bidder's identity and background; and (iii) the bidder's history with the target company. In addition, a potential acquirer must file Schedule 13D within 10 days of acquiring more than 5% of the shares of another company.

Tax consequence
The consummation of a tender offer resulting in payment to the shareholder is a taxable event triggering capital gains or losses, which may be long-term or short-term depending on the shareholder's holding period.

See also
Bond Tender Offer
Bond exchange offer
Mini-tender offer
Mergers and acquisitions
Contract awarding
List of largest mergers and acquisitions

References
SEC FAQ on tender offers
SEC regulations governing tender offers
David Offenberg, Christo A. Pirinsky, "How do acquirers choose between mergers and tender offers?" Journal of Financial Economics, 2015.
J. Fred Weston, Mark L. Mitchell, J. Harold Mulherin, Takeovers, Restructuring, and Corporate Governance

Corporate finance

ca:Oferta Pública d'Adquisició
fr:Offre publique d'achat
ja:株式公開買付け